Lee Musiker, American jazz musician
Sam Musiker, American jazz and Klezmer musician
Raffi Musiker, a Star Trek character

See also

Yiddish-language surnames
German-language surnames

de:Musiker (Familienname)